Cybister immarginatus is a species of beetle in family Dytiscidae.

References
 Universal Biological Indexer
 Zipcodezoo

Dytiscidae
Beetles described in 1798